LightBasin, also called UNC1945 by Mandiant, is a suspected Chinese cyber espionage group, that has been described as an advanced persistent threat that has been attributed to multiple cyberattacks on telecommunications companies. As an advanced persistent threat, they seek to gain unauthorized access to a computer network and remain undetected for an extended period. They have been attributed to attacks targeting Linux and Solaris systems.

History
The LightBasin cyber espionage group has operated since 2016. CrowdStrike say that they are based in China, though their exact location isn't known. They have targeted 13 telecoms operators.

Targets
CrowdStrike says that the group is unusual in targeting protocols and technology of telecoms operators. According to CrowdStrike's investigation of one such breach, LightBasin leveraged external Domain Name System (eDNS) servers — which are part of the General Packet Radio Service (GPRS) network and play a role in roaming between different mobile operators — to connect directly to and from other compromised telecommunication companies’ GPRS networks via Secure Shell and through previously established implants. Many of their tools are written for them rather than being off the shelf.

After compromising a system, then installed a backdoor, known as SLAPSTICK, for the Solaris Pluggable authentication module. They utilize TinyShell, which is a Python command shell used to control and execute commands through HTTP requests to a web shell, to communicate with attackers' ip addresses. The scripts are tunneled through an SGSN emulator, which CrowdStrike says is to maintain OPSEC. Serving GPRS Support Node (SGSN) is a main component of the GPRS network, which handles all packet switched data within the network, e.g. the mobility management and authentication of the users. Utilizing this form of tunneling makes it less likely to be restricted or inspected by network security solutions.

CrowdStrike recommend that firewalls dealing with GPRS traffic be configured to limit access to DNS or GPRS tunneling protocol traffic.

References

External links
 Crowdstrike blog entry on LightBasin
 Beyond Trust blog entry on LightBasin

Advanced persistent threat
Cyberwarfare by China
Espionage
Chinese advanced persistent threat groups